6 Richtige was a West German sitcom about the life of family "Richtig". It was broadcast between 1983–1984.

See also
List of German television series

External links
 

German comedy television series
1983 German television series debuts
1984 German television series endings
German-language television shows
Das Erste original programming